Fergus McDonell (1910-1974) was an English film editor and director. He was nominated for the Academy Award for Best Film Editing for Odd Man Out (1947), and his film The Hideout (aka The Small Voice) received a nomination for Best British Film at the 1949 BAFTA Awards.

Early life
Fergus McDonell was one of five children born to Angus MacDonnell, Judge of Trichonopoly, Madras and his wife Elsie Murdoch. His grandfather was Lord Aeneas Ranald MacDonell, 19th Chief of Clan MacDonell of Glengarry. Members of this family variously spell their surname ‘MacDonnell’, ‘Macdonnell’ and ‘McDonell’; Fergus used the latter spelling throughout his life. 

As was the custom among members of the Indian Civil Service during the Raj, it is likely that McDonell spent his early childhood in India and was sent back to England for his education. His brother Angus died at age two; he and his three other brothers attended Sedbergh School in Cumbria.

Career
In 1937, McDonell entered the film world as an editor on The Claydon Treasure Mystery, one of a series of B movies or ‘Quota Quickies’ which he would make between 1937 and 1950. Quota Quickies were a response to the protectionist Cinematograph Films Act 1927, which was intended to limit Hollywood imports and ensure that a healthy percentage of films screened in British cinemas were of British origin. American producers got around it by setting up shell companies in the UK to make low-budget films, often shot on two-week schedules. Their quality was so poor that it was not unusual for theatre owners to apologize to their customers, in advance. These ‘B’ films did not intend to be serious but they offered a springboard for talent, and a way for filmmakers to hone their craft. 

The films that McDonnel worked on, however, were of a better quality; his last B movie, Private Information (1952), was one of 15 films selected by Steve Chibnall and Brian McFarlane in their book The British 'B' Film, as among the most meritorious of the British B films made in Britain between World War II and 1970. Chibnall and McFarlane praise McDonell's "sensitive regard for human relationships and for the ways in which the pressure of circumstance highlights aspects of character", and they note that he "had a knack for obtaining striking performances from his leading ladies".

Private Information was the third film McDonell directed; by now, he was accomplished enough as an editor that Carol Reed’s 1947 film Odd Man Out garnered McDonell an Academy Award nomination for the Best Film Editing. The first film he directed, 1948’s The Hideout (also released as The Small Voice) received a nomination for Best British Film at the 1949 BAFTA Awards.

McDonell’s achievements caught the attention of the National Film Board of Canada and he was offered a job. In 1951, he moved to Ottawa and became an NFB editor. As an editor, he worked on 84 documentaries and short films; he became an NFB director in 1956 and made 31 films. 

In 1959, McDonell left the NFB to take the job of directing some of the episodes of the CBC series R.C.M.P.. He was simultaneously working on four episodes of a 12-film psychiatric series by his NFB colleague Robert Anderson called The Disordered Mind, which would also air on the CBC. He made two additional psychiatric films for Anderson and Geigy Pharmaceuticals, returned to the NFB as editor on two documentaries and, in 1961, moved back to England.

McDonell would not direct again, but he would act as editor of another 17 films, including the wildly popular What's New Pussycat? (1962). That was followed by, among others, The Caretaker, 1965’s Four in the Morning (which would win Judi Dench the 1966 BAFTA Award for Most Promising Newcomer), Stephen Frears first film Gumshoe (1971) and the critically-acclaimed Khartoum (1966). His last film was Terence Donovan’s Yellow Dog; he retired in 1974.

Personal life and death
In 1931, McDonell married Wendy Hamblin. They had three children, including the producer and editor Robin Murdoch McDonell. Fergus McDonnel died in Norfolk in 1984, at age 74.

Filmography
The Claydon Treasure Mystery - feature, Manning Haynes 1938 - editor 
I Met a Murderer - feature, Roy Kellino 1939 - editor 
Asking for Trouble - feature, Oswald Mitchell 1942 - editor
The Dummy Talks - feature, Oswald Mitchell 1943 - co-editor with Jack Harris
On Approval - feature, Clive Brook 1944 - editor
The Way Ahead - feature, Carol Reed 1944 - editor
The Way to the Stars, aka Johnny in the Clouds - feature, Anthony Asquith and Charles Saunders 1945 - editor
Odd Man Out - feature, Carol Reed 1947 - editor
The Small Voice aka The Hideout - feature, 1948 - director 
Prelude to Fame - feature, 1950 - director
Private Information - feature, 1952 - director
L'Homme à l'âge de la machine – short film, Donald Peters 1956 - editor
R.C.M.P. - Little Girl Lost - series episode 1959 - director
R.C.M.P. - Day of Reckoning - series episode 1960 - director 
R.C.M.P. - Trackdown - series episode 1960 - director
The Medical Use of Hypnosis - documentary short, Robert Anderson 1960 - editor
Voices in Space - documentary short, Robert Anderson 1960 - editor 
New North: Part 2. New Patterns in Flight - documentary short, Robert Anderson 1960 - editor
Man's Adaptability to Cold (Polar People) - documentary short, Robert Anderson 1960 - editor
Faces of Depression - documentary short, Robert Anderson 1960 - editor 
Pathological Anxiety - documentary short, Robert Anderson 1960 - editor 
The Disordered Mind: "Psychosomatic Disorders: A Coronary" - documentary short, Robert Anderson 1960 - editor
The Disordered Mind: "Psychoneurotic Conditions: A Pathological Anxiety" - documentary short, Robert Anderson 1960 - editor
The Disordered Mind: "Psychotic Conditions: A Depression" - documentary short, Robert Anderson and Henwar Rodakiewicz 1960 - editor
The Disordered Mind: "Anti-Social Personality Disorders: A Psychopath" - documentary short, Robert Anderson 1960 - editor
Emotional Factors in General Practice - documentary short, Robert Anderson 1960 - editor  
They Took Us to the Sea - documentary short, John Krish 1961 - editor
Some People - feature, Clive Donner 1962 - editor
The Caretaker aka The Guest - feature, Clive Donner 1963 - editor
Nothing but the Best - feature, Clive Donner 1964 - editor
Four in the Morning - feature, Anthony Simmons 1965 - editor
What's New Pussycat? - feature, Clive Donner 1965 - editor
The Three Musketeers - TV series, 10 episodes, Peter Hammond 1966 - editor
Khartoum - feature, Basil Dearden 1966 - editor
 Only When I Larf - feature, Basil Dearden 1966 - editor
Charlie Bubbles - feature, Albert Finney 1968 - editor 
 Here We Go Round the Mulberry Bush - feature, Clive Donner 1968 - editor
Alfred the Great - feature, Clive Donner 1969 - editor
Spring and Port Wine - feature, Peter Hammond 1970 - editor
Unman, Wittering and Zigo - feature, John Mackenzie 1971 - editor
Gumshoe - feature, Stephen Frears 1971 - supervising editor 
Mistress Pamela - feature, Jim O'Connolly 1973 - supervising editor 
Yellow Dog - feature, Terence Donovan 1973 - editor

National Film Board of Canada

Editor, Director

Canada’s Atom Goes to Work - documentary short, Roger Blais 1952 - editor
Beyond the Frontier - documentary short, Ronald Dick 1952 - editor
Singing Champions - documentary short, Roger Blais 1952 - co-editor with Arshad Mirza
The Mountain Movers - documentary short, Ron Weyman 1952 - editor
Citizen Varek - documentary short, Gordon Burwash 1953 - editor
Les deux pieds sur terre - documentary short, Larry Gosnell 1953 - editor
Canada at the Coronation - documentary, Allen Stark 1953 - co-editor with Eldon Rathburn and Kenneth Heeley-Ray
The Harbour - documentary short, Ernest Kirkpatrick 1953 - editor 
The Newcomers - documentary short, David Bennett 1953 - co-editor with Douglas Tunstall 
Farewell Oak Street - documentary short, Grant McLean 1953 - editor
The Ballot-o-Maniac - documentary short, Stanley Jackson 1953 - editor
Let’s Talk About Films - documentary short, Julian Biggs 1953 - editor
In Search of Home - documentary short, Ron Weyman 1953 - editor
Mission Ship - documentary short, Robert Anderson 1953 - editor
Inland Seaport - documentary short, Roger Blais 1953 - editor
Man Is a Universe - documentary short, Ron Weyman 1954 - editor
Bottleneck - documentary short, Leslie McFarlane 1954 - editor
The War on Want - documentary short, Gordon Burwash 1954 - editor
Vigil in the North - documentary short, 1954 - editor, director
College in the Wilds - documentary short, Julian Biggs 1954 - editor
Frontier College - documentary short, Julian Biggs 1954 - editor
Men at Work - documentary short, Donald Peters 1954 - editor
Diggers of the Deeps - documentary short, Grant McLean 1954 - editor
High Tide in Newfoundland - documentary short, Grant McLean 1954 - co-editor with Marion Meadows
British Empire and Commonwealth Games - documentary short, Jack Olsen 1954 - editor
The Curlers - documentary short, William Davidson 1955 - editor
Prairie Profile - documentary short, Gordon Burwash 1955 - editor
Problem Clinic - documentary short, Ron Weyman 1955 - editor
Road of Iron - documentary, Walford Hewitson 1955 - editor
The Dikes - documentary short, Roger Blais 1955 - editor
In This Dark World - documentary short, Jean Lenauer 1955 - editor
Strike in Town - documentary short, Leslie McFarlane 1955 - editor
The Shepherd - documentary short, Julian Biggs 1955 - editor
The Pony - short film, Lawrence Cherry 1955 - editor
Airwomen - documentary short, Ian MacNeill 1956 - editor
L'homme à l'âge de la machine - documentary short, Donald Peters 1956 - editor
Stress - documentary short, Ian MacNeill 1956 - editor
Operation Life Saver - documentary short, Isobel Kehoe 1956 - editor
Frontiers to Guard - documentary short, Ian MacNeill 1956 - editor
Are People Sheep? - documentary short, Julian Biggs 1956 - editor
Crash Rescue and Firefighting - documentary short, 1956 - editor, director
Train 406 - documentary short, 1956 - editor, director
Back into the Sun - documentary short, 1956 - director
Methods of Instruction - documentary short, 1956 - director
Morning Incident - documentary short, 1956 - director
The Nativity Cycle - documentary short, 1956 - director
The Cage - short film, 1956 - director
The Longer Trail - short film, 1956 - director
The Yellow Leaf - short film, 1956 - director
Borderline - documentary short, 1957 - director
Double Verdict - documentary short, 1957 - director
Capital City - documentary short, 1957 - director
Flagged for Action - documentary short, 1957 - director
Test Pilot -short film, 1957 - director
The Two Kingstons - documentary short, 1957 - director
The Happy Fugitive - short film, 1957 - director
The Street - short film, 1957 - director
None but the Lonely - short film, 1957 - director
The Harvest - short film, 1957 - director
The Ticket - documentary short, 1958 - director
Western Brigade - documentary short, 1958 - director
Un héritage, une tradition, une marine - documentary short, Kirk Jones 1960 - editor
An Enduring Tradition - documentary, Kirk Jones 1960 - editor
Canada’s Navy - documentary short, Kirk Jones 1962 - editor

References

External links
 

1910 births
1984 deaths
English film editors
English film directors
People from Royal Tunbridge Wells
People from Ticehurst
National Film Board of Canada people